Members of the Privy Council for Canada appointed since 2006.

By Prime Minister

Harper
The Honourable Jean-Pierre Blackburn	(from February 6, 2006)
The Honourable Gregory Francis Thompson	(from February 6, 2006)
The Honourable Marjory LeBreton	(from February 6, 2006)
The Honourable Monte Solberg	(from February 6, 2006)
The Honourable Chuck Strahl	(from February 6, 2006)
The Honourable Gary Lunn	(from February 6, 2006)
The Honourable Peter Gordon MacKay	(from February 6, 2006)
The Honourable Loyola Hearn	(from February 6, 2006)
The Honourable Stockwell Day	(from February 6, 2006)
The Honourable Carol Skelton	(from February 6, 2006)
The Honourable Vic Toews	(from February 6, 2006)
The Honourable Rona Ambrose	(from February 6, 2006)
The Honourable Michael D. Chong	(from February 6, 2006)
The Honourable Diane Finley	(from February 6, 2006)
The Honourable Gordon O'Connor	(from February 6, 2006)
The Honourable Beverley J. Oda	(from February 6, 2006)
The Honourable Jim Prentice	(from February 6, 2006)
The Honourable John Baird	(from February 6, 2006)
The Honourable Maxime Bernier	(from February 6, 2006)
The Honourable Lawrence Cannon	(from February 6, 2006)
The Honourable Tony Clement	(from February 6, 2006)
The Honourable James Michael Flaherty	(from February 6, 2006)
The Honourable Josée Verner	(from February 6, 2006)
The Honourable Michael Fortier	(from February 6, 2006)
The Honourable John Reynolds	(from February 6, 2006)
The Honourable Jay D. Hill	(from February 6, 2006)
The Honourable Peter Van Loan	(from November 27, 2006)
The Honourable Jason Kenney	(from January 4, 2007)
The Honourable Gerry Ritz	(from January 4, 2007)
The Honourable Helena Guergis	(from January 4, 2007)
The Honourable Christian Paradis	(from January 4, 2007)
The Honourable Daniel Philip Hays	(from January 22, 2007)
The Honourable James Abbott	(from October 15, 2007)
The Honourable Diane Ablonczy	(from August 14, 2007)
The Honourable James Moore	(from June 25, 2008)
The Honourable Denis Losier	(from September 3, 2008)
The Honourable Arthur Thomas Porter	(from September 3, 2008)
The Honourable Leona Aglukkaq	(from October 30, 2008)
The Honourable Keith Ashfield	(from October 30, 2008)
The Honourable Steven John Fletcher	(from October 30, 2008)
The Honourable Gary Goodyear	(from October 30, 2008)
The Honourable Peter Kent	(from October 30, 2008)
The Honourable Denis Lebel	(from October 30, 2008)
The Honourable Rob Merrifield	(from October 30, 2008)
The Honourable Lisa Raitt	(from October 30, 2008)
The Honourable Gail Shea	(from October 30, 2008)
The Honourable Lynne Yelich	(from October 30, 2008)
The Honourable Leonard Joseph Gustafson	(from January 8, 2009)
The Honourable Frances Lankin	(from January 22, 2009)
The Honourable Kevin Lynch	(from May 11, 2009)
The Honourable Rob Moore	(from January 19, 2010)
The Honourable Michael Grant Ignatieff	(from May 7, 2010)
The Honourable Philippe Couillard	(from June 21, 2010)
The Honourable John Duncan	(from August 6, 2010)
The Honourable Rick Casson	(from October 1, 2010)
The Honourable Laurie Hawn	(from October 1, 2010)
The Honourable Julian Fantino	(from January 4, 2011)
The Honourable Ted Menzies	(from January 4, 2011)
The Honourable Steven Blaney	(from May 18, 2011)
The Honourable Edward Fast	(from May 18, 2011)
The Honourable Joe Oliver	(from May 18, 2011)
The Honourable Peter Penashue	(from May 18, 2011)
The Honourable Tim Uppal	(from May 18, 2011)
The Honourable Alice Wong	(from May 18, 2011)
The Honourable Bal Gosal	(from May 18, 2011)
The Honourable Peter Andrew Stewart Milliken	(from May 8, 2012)
The Honourable Ronald Cannan	(from September 13, 2012)
The Honourable Mike Lake	(from September 13, 2012)
The Honourable Thomas J. Mulcair	(from September 14, 2012)
The Right Honourable Michaëlle Jean	(from September 26, 2012)
The Honourable Kerry-Lynne D. Findlay	(from February 22, 2013)
The Honourable Ernest Preston Manning	(from March 6, 2013)
The Honourable Deborah Grey	(from April 22, 2013)
The Honourable Shelly Glover (from July 15, 2013)
The Honourable Chris Alexander (from July 15, 2013)
The Honourable Khristinn Kellie Leitch (from July 15, 2013)
The Honourable Kevin Sorenson (from July 15, 2013)
The Honourable Pierre Poilievre (from July 15, 2013)
The Honourable Candice Bergen (from July 15, 2013)
The Honourable Greg Rickford (from July 15, 2013)
The Honourable Michelle Rempel	(from July 15, 2013)
The Honourable L. Yves Fortier	(from August 8, 2013)
The Honourable Claude Carignan	(from September 3, 2013)
The Honourable Gerald J. Comeau	(from September 19, 2013)
The Honourable Deepak Obhrai	(from September 19, 2013)
The Honourable Cyril Eugene McLean	(from March 6, 2014)
The Honourable Ed Holder	(from March 19, 2014)
His Royal Highness the Prince of Wales (Charles Philip Arthur George)	(from May 18, 2014)
The Honourable Wayne G. Wouters	(from December 10, 2014)
The Honourable Erin O'Toole	(from January 5, 2015)
The Honourable Ian Carl Holloway, Q.C.	(from January 30, 2015)
The Honourable Noël A. Kinsella	(from February 23, 2015)
The Honourable Marie-Lucie Morin	(from April 20, 2015)

J. Trudeau
The Right Honourable Justin P.J. Trudeau	(from November 4, 2015)
The Honourable William Francis Morneau	(from November 4, 2015)
The Honourable Jody Wilson-Raybould	(from November 4, 2015)
The Honourable Judy M. Foote	(from November 4, 2015)
The Honourable Chrystia Freeland	(from November 4, 2015)
The Honourable Jane Philpott	(from November 4, 2015)
The Honourable Jean-Yves Duclos	(from November 4, 2015)
The Honourable Marc Garneau	(from November 4, 2015)
The Honourable Marie-Claude Bibeau	(from November 4, 2015)
The Honourable James Gordon Carr	(from November 4, 2015)
The Honourable Mélanie Joly (from   November 4, 2015)
The Honourable Diane Lebouthillier	(from November 4, 2015)
The Honourable Kent Hehr	(from November 4, 2015)
The Honourable Catherine McKenna	(from November 4, 2015)
The Honourable Harjit Singh Sajjan	(from November 4, 2015)
The Honourable MaryAnn Mihychuk	(from November 4, 2015)
The Honourable Amarjeet Sohi	(from November 4, 2015)
The Honourable Maryam Monsef	(from November 4, 2015)
The Honourable Carla Qualtrough	(from November 4, 2015)
The Honourable Hunter Tootoo	(from November 4, 2015)
The Honourable Kirsty Duncan	(from November 4, 2015)
The Honourable Patricia A. Hajdu	(from November 4, 2015)
The Honourable Bardish Chagger	(from November 4, 2015)
The Honourable Andrew Leslie (from    February 15, 2016)
The Honourable Ginette Petitpas Taylor (from   February 15, 2016)
The Honourable V. Peter Harder (from   April 6, 2016)
The Honourable François-Philippe Champagne (from January 10, 2017)
The Honourable Karina Gould (from January 10, 2017)
The Honourable Ahmed Hussen (from January 10, 2017)
The Honourable Pablo Rodríguez (from January 26, 2017)
The Honourable Seamus Thomas Harris O'Regan (from August 28, 2017)
The Honourable Andrew Scheer (from September 25, 2017)
The Right Honourable Richard Wagner (from December 18, 2017)
The Honourable David McGuinty (from January 8, 2018)
The Right Honourable David Johnston (from March 26, 2018)
The Honourable William Sterling Blair (from July 18, 2018)
The Honourable Mary F. Y. Ng (from July 18, 2018)
The Honourable Filomena Tassi (from July 18, 2018)
The Honourable Jonathan Wilkinson (from July 18, 2018)
The Honourable Mark Holland (from September 14, 2018)
The Honourable David Lametti (from January 14, 2019)
The Honourable Bernadette Jordan (from January 14, 2019)
The Honourable Joyce Murray (from March 18, 2019)
The Honourable Marco E.L. Mendicino (from November 20, 2019)
The Honourable Steven Guilbeault (from November 20, 2019)
The Honourable Anita Anand (from November 20, 2019)
The Honourable Mona Fortier (from November 20, 2019)
The Honourable Marc Miller (from November 20, 2019)
The Honourable Deborah Schulte (from November 20, 2019)
The Honourable Daniel Vandal (from November 20, 2019)
The Honourable Marc Gold (from January 27, 2020)
The Honourable Omar Alghabra (from February 6, 2020)
The Honourable Randy Paul Andrew Boissonnault (from October 26, 2021)
The Honourable Sean Simon Andrew Fraser (from October 26, 2021)
The Honourable Gudrid Ida Hutchings (from October 26, 2021)
The Honourable Marci Ien (from October 26, 2021)
The Honourable Helena Jaczek (from October 26, 2021)
The Honourable Kamal Khera (from October 26, 2021)
The Honourable Pascale St-Onge (from October 26, 2021)
The Honourable Steven MacKinnon (from November 5, 2021)
The Honourable Greg Fergus (from December 10, 2021)
The Honourable Rob Oliphant (from December 10, 2021)

References

See also
List of current members of the Queen's Privy Council for Canada
List of members of the Privy Council for Canada (1867–1911)
List of members of the Privy Council for Canada (1911–1948)
List of members of the Privy Council for Canada (1948–1968)
List of members of the Privy Council for Canada (1968–2005)

2006-present